Donaldson is a city in Kittson County, Minnesota, United States.  The population was 20 at the 2020 census.

U.S. Route 75 and Minnesota State Highway 11 are two of the main arterial routes in the community.

History
A post office called Donaldson has been in operation since 1884. The city was named for Captain W. Donaldson, a local farmer.

Geography

Demographics

2010 census
As of the census of 2010, there were 42 people, 17 households, and 12 families living in the city. The racial makeup of the city was 100.0% White.

There were 17 households, of which 29.4% had children under the age of 18 living with them, 52.9% were married couples living together, 11.8% had a female householder with no husband present, 5.9% had a male householder with no wife present, and 29.4% were non-families. 29.4% of all households were made up of individuals. The average household size was 2.47 and the average family size was 3.08.

The median age in the city was 39 years. 28.6% of residents were under the age of 18; 2.3% were between the ages of 18 and 24; 26.2% were from 25 to 44; 21.5% were from 45 to 64; and 21.4% were 65 years of age or older. The gender makeup of the city was 54.8% male and 45.2% female.

2000 census
As of the census of 2000, there were 41 people, 18 households, and 10 families living in the city. The racial makeup of the city was 97.56% White, and 2.44% from two or more races. Hispanic or Latino of any race were 2.44% of the population.

There were 18 households, out of which 27.8% had children under the age of 18 living with them, 38.9% were married couples living together, 11.1% had a female householder with no husband present, and 38.9% were non-families. 38.9% of all households were made up of individuals, and 11.1% had someone living alone who was 65 years of age or older. The average household size was 2.28 and the average family size was 3.00.

In the city, the population was spread out, with 26.8% under the age of 18, 4.9% from 18 to 24, 34.1% from 25 to 44, 29.3% from 45 to 64, and 4.9% who were 65 years of age or older. The median age was 39 years. For every 100 females, there were 141.2 males. For every 100 females age 18 and over, there were 172.7 males.

The median income for a household in the city was $26,875, and the median income for a family was $34,375. Males had a median income of $31,250 versus $16,250 for females. The per capita income for the city was $11,637. There are 18.2% of families living below the poverty line and 7.7% of the population, including no under eighteens and none of those over 64.

References

Cities in Minnesota
Cities in Kittson County, Minnesota